Russia competed at the 2019 World Aquatics Championships in Gwangju, South Korea from 12 to 28 July.

Medalists

Artistic swimming

Russia's artistic swimming team consisted of 14 athletes (1 male and 13 female).

Women

Mixed

Diving

Russia has entered 13 divers (6 male and 7 female).

Men

Women

Mixed

High diving

Russia qualified three male high divers.

Open water swimming

Russia qualified four male and five female open water swimmers.

Men

Women

Mixed

Swimming

Men

Women

Mixed

Water polo

Women's tournament

Team roster

Head coach: Alexandr Gaidukov

Preliminary round

Quarterfinal

5–8th place semifinal

Fifth place game

References

World Aquatics Championships
Nations at the 2019 World Aquatics Championships
2019